Ranewal, also known as Ranewal Syedan, is a family village in the west of Jalalpur Jattan and near the University of Gujrat main campus in the Gujrat District of Punjab, Pakistan. The village is named after the family who lived there, believed to be Sayyid. It has an altitude of 234 metres.

References

Populated places in Gujrat District